The LAD machine gun (Russian: пулемет ЛАД) is a Soviet prototype light machine gun. Although belt-fed and having a built-in bipod, it is chambered for the Tokarev pistol cartridge. The LAD machine gun was developed between 1942 and 1943 by V. F. Lyuty, N. M. Afanasyev and V. S. Deykin. Only two prototypes were built and it was not accepted for service.

The two prototypes are on display at the Military Historical Museum of Artillery, Engineers and Signal Corps in Saint Petersburg.

References

  А. А. Малимон, Отечественные автоматы (записки испытателя оружейника), Moscow: Minister of Defense of the Russian Federation, 1999

7.62×25mm Tokarev firearms
Light machine guns
Firearms articles needing expert attention
Machine guns of the Soviet Union
Trial and research firearms of the Soviet Union